The Australian Youth Olympics Festival (AYOF) is an international multi-sport event organised by the Australian Olympic Committee for athletes from 13 to 19 years of age. The first event was held in 2001.

Competing nations

Sports

Editions
The AOC has conducted six Australian Youth Olympic Festivals (in 2001, 2003, 2005, 2007, 2009 and 2013. for athletes from 13 to 19 years of age. Overall, $18.6 million has been in invested in staging the Festivals.

See also

 2007 Australian Youth Olympic Festival
 2013 Australian Youth Olympic Festival

References

External links
Australian Olympic Committee

 
Multi-sport events in Australia
Recurring sporting events established in 2001
Youth sport in Australia
Sports festivals in Australia
2001 establishments in Australia
Youth multi-sport events